Events from the year 1778 in Austria

Incumbents
 Monarch – Maria Theresa
 Monarch – Joseph II

Events

 
 

 - War of the Bavarian Succession

Births

 

  
 January 26 -  Johann Georg Stauffer, Austrian luthier (d. 1853)
 March 23 – Paul Traugott Meissner, Austrian chemist (d. 1864)
 March 24 - Anton Edler von Gapp, Austrian lawyer (d. 1862)
 April 10 - Johann Arzberger, Austrian technologist (d. 1835)
 May 8 - Johann Baptist Gänsbacher, Austrian composer (d. 1844)
 July 10 - Sigismund von Neukomm, Austrian composer and pianist (d. 1858)
 August 2 - Georg Anton Rollett, Austrian naturalist (d. 1842)
 November 16 – Johann Joseph von Prechtl, Austrian technologist (d. 1854)

Deaths

 
 
 
 
 July 3 – Anna Maria Mozart, Austrian mother to the Mozarts (b. 1720)

References

 
Years of the 18th century in Austria